This article covers the levee system and infrastructure repairs in New Orleans, Louisiana following Hurricane Katrina.

Though Hurricane Katrina did not deal the city of New Orleans a direct hit on August 29, 2005, the associated storm surge precipitated catastrophic failures of the levees and flood walls. The Mississippi River Gulf Outlet ("MR-GO") breached its levees in approximately 15 places. The major levee breaches in the city include the 17th Street Canal levee, the London Avenue Canal, and the wide, navigable Industrial Canal, which left approximately 80% of the city flooded.

While ownership, definition of requirements, operation and maintenance of the system belonged to the Orleans Levee Board, federal responsibility for New Orleans' flood protection design and construction belongs by federal mandate to the US Army Corps of Engineers.

Flooding from the breaches put the majority of the city under water for days, in many places for weeks. The Corps made emergency repairs to breaches, as pumps worked at draining the city. Hurricane Rita brushed the city nearly a month later, causing reflooding of some areas, most significantly from water flowing through incompletely repaired levee breaches.

Background

Flooding due to rain and storms has long been an issue since the New Orleans' early settlement due to the city's location on a delta marsh, much of which sits below sea level. The city is surrounded by the Mississippi River to the south, Lake Pontchartrain to the north, and Lake Borgne to the east. Construction of the levees along the River began soon after the city was founded, and more extensive river levees were built as the city grew. The levees were originally designed to prevent damage caused by seasonal flooding. Today, the floodwalls atop the 17th Street and London Avenue Canals are used for drainage, to pump water from the city streets out to Lake Pontchartrain. These floodwalls are one foot (300 mm) wide at the top and widened to two feet (600 mm) at the base. The visible portion is a concrete cap on steel sheet pile that anchors to the wall.  Sheet piles are interlocked steel columns, in this case at least 30 feet (10 m) long, with 6 to 10 feet (2 to 3 m) visible above ground; examinations afterward showed that some pilings were not as deep as specified. The wide, navigable Industrial Canal is used for shipping.

The heavy flooding caused by Hurricane Betsy in 1965 brought concerns regarding flooding from hurricanes to the forefront. Congress removed responsibility from the state and mandated that the US Army Corps of Engineers have sole authority over the design and construction of the New Orleans area flood protection, although local cooperation was stipulated. This is spelled out in the Flood Control Act of 1965.  Forty years later when Katrina struck, the flood protection was between 60-90% completed with an estimated completion date of 2015, despite the initial expectation of completion within thirteen years.  As of May 2005, work in Orleans Parish was certified as 90% complete, with "some work remaining" along the London Avenue Canals, and 70% complete in Jefferson Parish.

There were many predictions of hurricane risk in New Orleans before Hurricane Katrina in August, 2005. In 2001, the Houston Chronicle published a story which predicted that a severe hurricane striking New Orleans, "would strand 250,000 people or more, and probably kill one of 10 left behind as the city drowned under  of water. Thousands of refugees could land in Houston." Many concerns also focused around the fact that the city's levee system was only designed for hurricanes of no greater intensity than category 3. As it turned out, Katrina was Category 3 when it made landfall and most of New Orleans experienced Category 1 or 2 strength winds. However, due to the slow moving nature of the storm in its pass over New Orleans, several floodwalls lining the shipping and drainage canals in New Orleans collapsed and the resulting flood water from Lake Pontchartrain inundated the city within the two days following the storm, causing costly damage to buildings and resulting in many deaths.

Furthermore, the region's natural defenses, the surrounding marshland and the barrier islands, have been dwindling in recent years due to human interference.

Levee repairs

Pre-storm preparations

On Saturday, August 27, while Katrina was a Category 3 storm gathering strength in the Gulf of Mexico, the Army Corps of Engineers Mississippi Valley Division was preparing and posturing elements from as far as Hawaii. Anticipating the possibility of a Category 5 storm placing water in New Orleans, preparations began for drainage operations.

On August 29, 2005, as Katrina made its second and third landfalls on the Louisiana-Mississippi coast, Corps District Commander, Col. Richard Wagenaar, and a team worked out of an emergency operations shelter in New Orleans. Other teams waited in the storm's path across the Gulf coast.

The Corps worked with the U.S. Coast Guard, Army National Guard and other state and federal authorities to bring in all assets available to expedite the process. "We're attempting to contract for materials, such as rock, super sand bags, cranes, etc., and also for modes of transportation like barges and helicopters, to close the gap and stop the flow of water from Lake Pontchartrain into the city," said Walter Baumy, Engineering Division chief and project manager for closing the breach.

Flooding

Corps' engineers initially believed that water in the 17th Street Canal overtopped the floodwall, scoured behind the wall, and caused it to collapse. However, three local fire captains confirmed with video footage that the floodwall had failed before water reached the top.  The floodwall breached on the lower (New Orleans West End) side inland from the Old Hammond Highway Bridge.

There were three major breaches at the Industrial Canal; one on the upper side near the junction with MR-GO, and two on the lower side along the Lower Ninth Ward, between Florida Avenue and Claiborne Avenue.  The London Avenue Canal breached in two places, on the upper side just back from Robert E. Lee Boulevard, and on the lower side a block in from the Mirabeau Avenue Bridge.

By the evening of August 29, 2005, approximately 28 levee failures were reported throughout the city.  Approximately 66% to 75% of the city was now under water. Wind and other storm damage had already stopped the city. Many power lines were down and the remains of trees and buildings blocked streets.

As Corps of Engineers' workers began working with the Federal Emergency Management Agency (FEMA) begin work on city cleanup and civil engineering tasks, several boats surveyed the flooded areas and blocked waterways around the city. Corps of Engineers used crane barges to remove barges that had been washed atop bridges and other structures.

Plans were made to begin levee work, including the placement of 3,000 pound sand bags on the 17 Street Canal. Army National Guard helicopters began assisting in this operation August 31. Meanwhile, Lake Pontchartrain started slowly draining and was expected to return to normal levels in about 36 hours.

Recovery

The breach at the 17th Street Canal Levee, a levee-floodwall combination, was found to be about 300 feet (100 m) long. This hypothesis was later refuted by eyewitnesses.

The Corps released two contracts to close the breach in the 17th Street Canal. The 3,000 pound sandbag operation at the 17th Street Canal was postponed early in the day when U.S. Army Chinook helicopters were diverted for rescue missions. The Corps continued to coordinate with Army officials to have helicopters assist in the placement of sandbags at the breaches. The 3,000 pound sandbags were each about  square (1 m).

Corps officials worked with Orleans Parish and Louisiana Department of Transportation officials and Boh Bros. Construction Co., L.L.C., headquartered in New Orleans, to place piling at the lakefront to stop the flow in the 17th Street Canal. This would stabilize the water flow and allow work on the levee, while also helping to stabilize the rest of the levee system.

Along with local and state officials, the Corps contracted to build access roads to the breach sites and to fill in the breaches. Rock/stone/crushed concrete was hauled in by truck for road construction and repairing the breaches. One plan called for building an access road from Hammond Highway to the 17th Street breach, and then southward to the end of the breach.

To assist in draining the city, the Corps delivered two 5,000 cubic feet per second (140 m³/s) pumps to the Louisiana Superdome.

Construction

With Lake Pontchartrain almost back to normal levels, little water was flowing out of the city. This allowed a change of plans, and marine equipment was used to drive sheet piling at the mouth of the 17th Street Canal to seal off the entire canal from the lake.

Shortly after 1:00 p.m., the first piece of sheet piling was driven, to form a steel wall across the lake's entrance to the 17th Street canal. A contractor began bringing in rock to build a road toward the breach, which was south and east of the Hammond Highway bridge over the canal, with dry land on the west side of the bridge.

Rock was being transported from offsite to complete the access road and closure at the 17th Street breach. Once the rock required to build the roads arrived in New Orleans and the access road to the breach was completed, the Corps estimated closure of the breach could be completed in three to four days. Several private firms have volunteered services and provided assistance in design of the closure.

Similar work was planned for sealing a  London Avenue breach, although in that case materials would come from demolition of Lakeshore Drive. Five  pumps were ordered to assist in draining the city.

The 17th Street Canal Levee, was now estimated to have a breach 450 feet (150 m) long. It was still believed that water overtopped the floodwall, scoured the structure, and then moved the structure 20 feet (6 m) horizontally.

Work continued on nearby waterways, including several locks which were closed. Use of some of the locks required raising bridges. The Industrial Canal Lock needed repair, and its lockmaster raised the St. Claude Avenue bridge, but lowered it because of hostility from civilians wanting to cross on both sides.

Water flow stopped

By September 1, 2005, the mouth of the 17th Street Canal had been sealed with the sheet piling preventing lake water from getting to the levee breach. Since no additional water can get through the breach it was no longer necessary to seal the breach itself. The next step was to get existing pumps working, and to bring in additional pumps to drain the surrounding city and the canal. Later, the canal was drained so that permanent repairs could be made to the levee. To allow drainage, backhoes mounted on marsh buggies and draglines mounted on barges cut breaches in some other levees. Marsh buggies are tracked vehicles whose wide tracks enable them to operate in soft, marshy terrain.

Helicopters were dropping large sandbags made of strong, synthetic materials in the breach. Heavy equipment on the ground has been placing rock. Ground access was created by building a rock road from Hammond Highway, which is about 700 feet (200 m) lake-ward of the breach. The 17th Street Canal is a drainage canal whose dimensions and an important bridge, integral to the flood control system, would not permit entry of barges and towboats to haul rocks and placement cranes.

A pump station began pumping out about 5,000 cubic feet per second (140 m³/s) at the Industrial Canal. One pump was working in New Orleans East. At this point, the process of removing water was estimated to take 36 and 80 days, according to Brig. Gen. Robert Crear.

By September 3, 2005, the first of the five new pumps were delivered. Four more pumps have been loaned to the Corps by St. Charles Parish.

Breach closed

By September 5, 2005, the 17th Street Canal breach was closed. Blackhawk and Chinook helicopters had dropped over 200 sand bags, with approximately 125 sandbags breaking the surface of the water. After the emergency is over, plans called for the canal to be drained and the wall repaired.

There were three 42" mobile pumps staged and two 42" and two 30" pumps were placed at the sheet pile closure. Sewer & water board, electric utility and the 249th Engineer Battalion (Prime Power) were completing pump house inspection. When the pumps began operation, a  opening was made in the sheet piling to allow water to flow out of the canal.

Pumping and moving on

By September 6, 2005, the pump stations began to get online on 17th Street Canal. Pump Station 10 was actually pumping at this point. Pump Station 6 was interrupted to clean up some debris out of the area. Pump Station 1, which is a little bit further up in the system, was pumping to Pump Station 6, so as to drain the upper area, uptown areas. Over on the east side, Pump Station 19 had been running for some time. Two of the three big pumping stations in New Orleans East were running, in addition to temporary pumps. At least one pump station was running in Plaquemines Parish.

It was decided to use sheet pile closure to stop water flow at the London Avenue breach, similar to what was done at 17th Street Canal. A rock wall had initially been built there. The London Avenue canal was drained so that the breach can be repaired.

Portable pumps were used to remove water from the city. The estimated area of flooding was reduced to 60%. By late Tuesday afternoon, 3 of the 148 permanent pumps had been restored to operation. Important steps in returning more pumps to operation include repairing breaches in the London Avenue and Industrial canals. Repair of the London Avenue breach was estimated to require two weeks. Steps in repairing the Industrial canal breach include removal of two damaged barges and one that had sunk.

On the morning of September 7, 2005, approximately 60% of the city was still under water. Blackhawk helicopters continued to deliver 7,000 pound sandbags to London Avenue. Sandbagging operations continued 24 hours a day. The Corps expected to close two breaches at the London Avenue Canal within 24 hours. Employees and contractors were temporarily using sandbags to close these holes.

Several small breaches caused by the storm had been found and were being closed. Draining the city was estimated to take anywhere from 24 to 80 days. Volunteers from as far as Germany and the Netherlands offered to assist with pumps and generators.

Engineers found two breaches on the east side of the Inner Harbor Navigational Canal and one on its west side. They closed the larger of the two breaches on the east side yesterday and filled the smaller of the two breaches with clay and stone. Work will begin on the west side as soon as feasible.

23 of the 148 permanent pumps had now been restored to operation. Three pumps were operating at the 17th Street Canal, discharging water at around 2,250 cubic feet per second (64 m³/s).  Pump station 19 at the Industrial Canal, just north of Florida Avenue, was pumping 1,300 cubic feet per second (37 m³/s). Pump station 8, located in St. Bernard Parish in the vicinity of St. Mary, was running at full capacity at 837 cubic feet per second (24 m³/s).

By this time, approximately 100 U.S. Army Corps of Engineers workers were in New Orleans. Over 500 contracted workers were involved in repairs.

However, officials were wary of operating the pumps at full capacity because of the possibility of damaging newly repaired levees and of losing corpses.

By Friday, September 9, 2005, 32 of 148 existing pumps in New Orleans proper were operating, pumping 11,282 cubic feet per second (319 m³/s), and 38 portable pumps were operating, pumping 734 cubic feet per second (21 m³/s). In addition, 9 of 26 existing pumps in Plaquemines Parish reported operating at 1,360 cubic feet per second (39 m³/s). It was estimated, based on average seasonal rainfall, that Orleans Parish would be drained by the week of October 2, 2005. Orleans East and Chalmette would be drained by the week of October 8, 2005, and Plaquemines Parish would be drained by the week of October 18, 2005.

By Saturday, September 10, 2005, there were 148 organic pumps in the New Orleans area being worked, with an average of 26 permanent pumps operating, pumping 9,125 cubic feet per second (258 m³/s) and 39 portable pumps were operating, pumping 723 cubic feet per second (20 m³/s). In addition, nine of 26 existing pumps in Plaquemines Parish reported operating at 1,360 cubic feet per second (39 m³/s).  The equivalent to an Olympic-sized swimming pool was being drained every two seconds.

Final critical breach closed
The fourth and final critical breach in the Orleans and East Orleans areas was closed. A roadway had been built, at the rate of 500 feet (150 m) a day, from the 17th Street Canal work area to reach the London Avenue Canal breach.  From the London Avenue west side breach, the road was built to the second breach area at Mirabeau Road.

As at the 17th Street Canal, at the London Avenue Canal the flow from Lake Pontchartrain into the canal had been cut off. Corps contractors drove 150 feet (50 m) of steel piling across the canal to seal it.

Texas Army National Guard Chinook and Blackhawk helicopter crews had placed an average of 600 7,000-pound sandbags each day into the breaches. Depending on the helicopters lift capability, Corps riggers averaged one to three hookups every two minutes during daylight hours. Sandbagging operations ran 24 hours for ten days and, with the breaches complete, were halted September 10.

Several crane barges were also used to place sandbags and gravel, and other barges were used to haul equipment, pumps, generators and people to sites.

By Sunday, September 11, 2005, the number of operating pumps had been raised to 74 of 174, with the high capacity Pumping Station 6 expected to be returned to service within days. Officials lowered the estimated maximum amount of time required to unwater New Orleans to 40 days, or late October, 2005.

By September 12, 2005, water had overtopped the temporary breach closure at the London Avenue Canal because of operations at Pump Station 3. This caused the canal to rise faster than the temporary pumps at the end of the canal could drain. Operations at Pump Station 3 were immediately stopped and a few sheet piles were removed to allow the canal water level to equalize.

September 13

For nearly a week, Plaquemines Parish floodwaters were receding naturally through three breaches and a deliberate notch. The unwatering operation was getting results approaching  pumping out of Orleans, East Orleans and St. Bernard parishes. In the 17th Street Bridge area, watermarks on homes showed evidence of at least a six-foot drop in water levels. In Plaquemines Parish, five of ten permanent pumps are pushing over 4,100 cubic feet per second (116 m³/s). 27 of 104 permanent pumps and 43 temporary pumps were running, pushing more than 13,000 cubic feet per second (368 m³/s) out of the metropolitan New Orleans area.

Corps crews in Saint Bernard Parish cut the roadway at Highway 48 to allow drainage to Pump Station 8. At Pump Stations 1, 4, 6 and 7, the Corps installed booms or floating oil barriers to protect facilities from oil hazards. The Corps continued to monitor the area. Crews also installed a temporary roof at Pump Station 7, enabling the station crew to begin necessary maintenance. The unwatering mission in St. Bernard Parish was expected to be completed within the next week.

In East Orleans, four more portable pumps were to be added in support of Pump Station 15 to increase the overall capacity to 1,100 cubic feet per second (31 m³/s). For the first time, the Jahncke Pump Station ran at its full capacity of 1,200 cubic feet per second (34 m³/s). Citrus Pump Station and St. Charles Pump Station each were running at half capacity because the Citrus Pump Station has to pull power from a generator at one of the other two stations. Total possible capacity for these two stations is 1,750 cubic feet per second (50 m³/s).

The Corps cleared the rock dike at Lake Shore Drive, removing sheet pile, and raising wire sheet to allow Pump Station 3 to continue pumping at a high rate. Corps personnel were monitoring both breach sites at London Avenue Canal around the clock.

Corps contractors were expected to complete the road to the second London Avenue breach the following day.

Halfway done
By September 15, 2005, the inundation of the city had been reduced from 80% to 40%, although flooded areas were not expected to be habitable for a long while. In Orleans Parish, most of the Ninth Ward of New Orleans and the southern part of Orleans Parish were dry enough for normal recovery operations to begin. Water remained in the northern part of the parish and would be pumped out using Pump Stations 12 and 4, and reinforced with about a dozen temporary pumps. Some construction work continued on the 17th Street and London Avenue canal breaches where helicopters were precision-placing 7,000-pound sandbags to reinforce existing repairs and crews were armoring sandbag closures with rock. Contractors maintained cranes at the sites to regulate flow levels by adjusting sheet pile walls at the mouths of the canals into Lake Pontchartrain. Construction of the access road to the second London Canal breach north of Mirabeau bridge was completed September 14. St. Bernard's Parish was almost completely dry, with the only significant water remaining in the Chalmette extension. However, recovery in St. Bernard's Parish was limited by the spill of petroleum products from local oil facilities. In Plaquemines Parish, repairs to the levee breaches continued and were almost ready for full-scale pumping of the affected areas. Most of the fixed pumping stations in Plaquemines Parish had survived the storm.

The focus of pump repair efforts shifted from Pump Station 1, which was now operating, to Pump Station 4 in Orleans Parish. On September 15,  of water was pumped out of the city. It was estimated the overall effort would be completed in early October.

From a ground survey, the Corps had identified nine breaches that must be repaired to provide a minimum level of protection to the affected parishes. Of these, seven had been repaired to date, one was being used to allow drainage to leave St. Bernard's Parish and one was being addressed in Plaquemines Parish. Additionally, levees had been deliberately notched at two sites in St. Bernard's Parish to facilitate the unwatering mission. Of these, one had been closed and one was still in use.

 Breach on 17th Street canal in Orleans Parish. Repaired.
 Northern breach on London canal in Orleans Parish. Repaired.
 Southern breach on London canal in Orleans Parish. Repaired.
 Northern breach on the IHNC in Orleans Parish. Repaired.
 Southern breach on the IHNC in Orleans Parish. Repaired.
 Breach in St Bernard's Parish. Not repaired – water is flowing out naturally.
 Three breaches in Plaquemines Parish. Two repaired.

On the Inner Harbor Navigation Canal, Corps contractors used crane barges to remove two barges from “atop” the Florida Avenue Bridge, also commonly known as the L&N Bridge.

September 18
"The system in its present condition does not ensure that the city will be protected from flooding resulting from storms or hurricanes," stressed Col. Duane Gapinski, Task Force Unwatering commander. Gapinski said that residents could be placing their lives and property at risk by re-entering flooded areas until additional emergency levee repairs are made. State and local leaders were informed as assessments are being completed and repairs are made.

Recovery of New Orleans was seen as a three-phase process: first and most immediate, to unwater the city and assess flood protection. Second, to provide an interim level of protection to get the city through hurricane season and later high water, and over the long-term, to return the system to pre-hurricane conditions. This will take a tremendous amount of study, research, funding and construction.

The Corps estimated the New Orleans area was more than 80 percent unwatered. Corps officials estimated the overall unwatering effort, given normal seasonal rainfall, would be completed no later than early October, 2005. Tropical Storm Rita was being closely watched at this point. Additional traffic in the city in the past three days had caused some delay in traveling to work sites and moving emergency repair equipment.

Preparation for Hurricane Rita

By September 21, 2005, the Army Corps of Engineers had begun closing two damaged canals at noon in preparation for storm surges associated with Hurricane Rita. The 17th Street and London Avenue Canals were closed with steel sheet piling by evening and remained closed until the threat of severe weather passed. Steel sheets would be driven deep into the canal beds near Lake Pontchartrain, providing protection from possible storm surges from the lake rushing into the damaged canals.

More than 800 filled sandbags were on hand, and an additional 2,500 ordered. Work continued around the clock to make emergency repairs to damaged canal walls and levees.

Hurricane Rita's flooding

By September 23, 2005, although high water caused by Hurricane Rita flowed over the temporary closure on the Industrial Harbor Navigation canal, the structure remained intact. This reflooded part of eastern New Orleans.

November and December

The Corps continued work into November and December 2005 on filling the breaches in the London Avenue and 17th Street canals, as water continued to seep through the temporary breach repairs into streets.

Completion of temporary repairs
By January 2006, the Army Corps of Engineers announced that temporary repairs of the Industrial, London Avenue, and 17th Street Canals had been finished. A project for more permanent repairs started.

Future improvements
In January 2007, the Army Corps of Engineers, after having visited the extensive "Delta Works" levee system in the Netherlands, awarded a $150 million contract to a group of Dutch engineering companies for the evaluation, design and construction management of levees and floodwalls, special closure structures for protection of the communities adjacent to the Inner Harbor Navigation Canal, major pumping facilities and planning studies for improved levels of flood protection for New Orleans and southern Louisiana. The Delta Works are a series of constructions built between 1953 and 1997 in the southwest of the Netherlands to protect a large area of land around the Rhine-Meuse-Scheldt delta from the sea. The works consist of dams, sluices, locks, levees, and storm surge barriers. The works were initiated after the North Sea flood of 1953 in which 2,170 people were killed.

Since Katrina, the US, through the Army Corps of Engineers, has made a $14.45 billion investment in the area around New Orleans. Some of the projects include:

 Hundreds of levee and pump station improvements. 
 The IHNC Lake Borgne Surge Barrier, the longest storm surge barrier in the United States
 The Seabrook Floodgate, a floodgate at the connection of Lake Pontchartrain with the Industrial Canal

Bridges, Roadways, and Railways
Approximately 45 bridges were damaged by some aspect of the hurricane. Several major bridges were among the worst damaged, with the I-10 Twin Span Bridge as the most catastrophic failure with over 470 spans separated from their supports and nearly 65 fallen completely into the water. Other vital bridges damaged enough to impede traffic included the Pontchartrain Causeway, St. Louis Bay Bridge, and Biloxi Bay Bridge.

Mississippi railways and roads, when not affected by bridge collapsing, were disrupted due to heavy debris. Removal costs are estimated at $200 million for that area. Damage to the Louisiana roadway systems was mostly due to washouts and has been deemed minimal.

Other infrastructure repair

On Monday, September 5, 2005, electrical power began to be restored to buildings in the central business district of New Orleans on a priority basis. By Thursday, September 8, Entergy had restored 9 of 17 electricity generating units in the New Orleans area to service. Entergy's 1000 MW Waterford and Watson plants were still out of service, with the Watson plant expected to require 6–12 weeks to repair. By Friday, electrical power had been restored to 11% of New Orleans customers. Also, officials were organizing to have work begin as soon as Monday, September 12, to rebuild the, "twin spans" I-10 bridge to New Orleans.

On Tuesday, September 6, 2005, the Port of New Orleans, the largest U.S. port in terms of tonnage handled, was able to receive and service relief ships. It was estimated that resumption of commercial shipments would take at least 14 days.

By Wednesday, September 7, 2005, safe drinking water was available in some West Bank areas, including Algiers and the Jefferson Parish suburbs, and some water pressure was available in New Orleans for fire fighting. All sewage from the city was flowing untreated into the Mississippi. The Lower Mississippi River was open during daylight hours to shallow draft traffic and deep draft vessels less than 39 feet (12 m). A contractor removed obstacles in the Southwest Pass, which was restricting deep draft navigation.

The Louis Armstrong New Orleans International Airport reopened on Monday, September 12, 2005, to cargo traffic, with limited passenger service expected to resume Tuesday, September 13, 2005.

Officials awarded a $30.9 million contract to repair the, "twin spans" I-10 bridge to New Orleans to Boh Brothers Construction Co. on September 12, 2005. It was estimated that 45 days would be required before the bridge could reopen to normal traffic. Water pressure had now been restored in the majority of the Jefferson Parish. A "boil water" order was still in force on the East Bank, but had been lifted for the West Bank. On the East Bank, 17% of sewage pumps were operational, and 39% were operational on the West Bank.

On Tuesday, September 13, 2005, the Mississippi River upstream of Head of Passes was declared open by the United States Coast Guard. The Head of Passes — 95 miles (153 km) downriver from New Orleans as measured from Algiers Point — is where the river branches off into separate passes into the Gulf. The only part of the river operating under any restrictions was from the main stem of the Mississippi River channel through Southwest Pass to the Gulf. That section was limited to daylight traffic. The Coast Guard continued restoring Aids to Navigation (AToN) to allow night transits, giving first priority to those AToNs described by pilots as being most critical.

The Gulf Intracoastal Waterway was opened from Texas to Florida using Baptiste Collette Bayou as an alternative to the IHNC. The GIWW reach from Baptiste Collette to Pascagoula was limited to 9.5' draft, versus the 12' authorized. Caution was recommended for transit.

The Inner Harbor Navigation Canal (IHNC) Lock became operational but was still not operating due to bridge closures and sunken barges, the removal of which was anticipated to take until mid-week.

The Mississippi River Gulf Outlet was closed to deep draft vessels. The inland portion was serving as an alternative route to the GIWW due to closure of the IHNC for shallow draft vessels. Preliminary surveys indicated a controlling depth of 27'.

Port Fourchon sustained significant damage, but was operating to a limited extent. Sunken vessels were not blocking the channel.

Tiger Pass was shoaled to less than 6'. This channel, authorized to 14' provides a shorter route for vessels traveling to the west from the Mississippi River near the mouth. Primarily used by fishing and supply vessels. Dredging was planned.

The Army Corps of Engineers conducted preliminary surveys for Atchafalaya, Houma, and other channels. NOAA continued its surveys of the Mississippi River to verify the Corps centerline survey results.

See also 
 Levee failures in Greater New Orleans, 2005
 U.S. Army Corps of Engineers civil works controversies
 U.S. Army Corps of Engineers civil works controversies (New Orleans)
 Flood Control Act of 1965
 17th Street Canal
 Drainage in New Orleans
 Hurricane Katrina
 Hurricane Rita
 ING 4727
 Industrial Canal
 Inner Harbor Navigation Canal (IHNC) Seabrook Floodgate Structure
 London Avenue Canal

References

External links
 Independent Levee Investigation Team Report - U of California Berkeley
 Levees.org - Non profit in New Orleans holding the Army Corps accountable for their flood protection nationwide

Hurricane Katrina recovery in New Orleans